Wuhan Institute of Technology (WIT; ; colloquially 武工大, Pinyin: WǔGōngDà) is a university in Wuhan, Hubei province, China.

History
The university was founded in 1972 as Hubei Institute of Petrochemical and Chemical Technology. It was under the administration of the Ministry of Education of the People's Republic of China.

In 1980, with the authorization of the Ministry of Education of China, it was renamed Wuhan Institute of Chemical Technology. In 2006 it was renamed again as Wuhan Institute of Technology by the Ministry of Education.

Organization and administration
WIT has 15 schools:
  School of Chemical Engineering and Pharmacy
  School of Mechanical & Electrical Engineering
  School of Material Science and engineering
  School of Environment and Civil Engineering
  School of Electrical and Electronic Engineering
  School of Economic management
  School of Law & Business
  School of computer science and engineering
  School of Science
  School of Foreign Languages
  School of Arts
  School of Adult Education
  International School
  Department of P.E.
  School of Telecommunication & Information Engineering

References

External links

Official website (English version)
Official website (简体中文版)
Official BBS (简体中文)
Wuhan Institute of Technology Alumni Network

1972 establishments in China
Universities and colleges in Wuhan
Educational institutions established in 1972